Kurt Walker may refer to:
Kurt Walker (ice hockey) (1954–2018), American professional ice hockey player
Kurt Walker (boxer) (born 1995), Irish boxer
Kurt Walker, character in the film Life as a House